Kępiny Małe  is a village in the administrative district of Gmina Nowy Dwór Gdański, within Nowy Dwór Gdański County, Pomeranian Voivodeship, in northern Poland.

The village has a population of 440.

References

External links
 The Fall of Zeyer 1945

Villages in Nowy Dwór Gdański County